The 2016–17 Turkish Cup is the 55th season of the Turkish Cup. Ziraat Bankası is the sponsor of the tournament, thus the sponsored name is Ziraat Turkish Cup. The winners will earn a berth in the group stage of the 2017–18 UEFA Europa League, and also qualify for the 2017 Turkish Super Cup.

Competition Format

Preliminary round
 28 teams from Regional Amateur League competed in this round. Seeds are for informative purpose only; they did not apply in this round's draw.

 14 teams (50%) from Regional Amateur League qualified for the next round.
 9 seeded (64%) and 5 unseeded (36%) teams qualified for the next round.
 Biggest upsets were Hakkarispor FK (no ranking) and 68 Aksaray Bld (no ranking) eliminating Tatvan G.Birliği (ranked 189) and Osmaniyespor FK (ranked 202), respectively.
 Lowest ranked teams qualified for the next round were 68 Aksaray Bld (no ranking), Hakkarispor FK (no ranking) and Muşspor FC (no ranking); highest ranked team got eliminated was Adıyaman 1954 SK (ranked 145).

First round
 58 teams from Third League and 14 teams from Regional Amateur League competed in this round. Seeds are for informative purpose only; they did not apply in this round's draw.

 31 teams (53%) from Third League and 5 teams (36%) from Regional Amateur League qualified for the next round.
 19 seeded (53%) and 17 unseeded (47%) teams qualified for the next round.
 Biggest upset was Serhat Ardahan (ranked 228) eliminating Bayburt Grup Özel İdare (ranked 81).
 Lowest ranked team qualified for the next round was Serhat Ardahan (ranked 228); highest ranked team got eliminated was Ankara Demirspor (ranked 75).

|}

Second round
 8 teams from Super League, 18 teams from First League, 36 teams from Second League, 31 teams from Third League and 5 teams from Regional Amateur League competed in this round. Seeds were applied in this round's draw.

 5 teams (63%) from Super League, 12 teams (67%) from First League, 21 teams (58%) from Second League, 10 teams (32%) from Third League and 1 team (20%) from Regional Amateur League qualified for the next round.
 32 seeded (65%) and 17 unseeded (35%) teams qualified for the next round.
 Biggest upset was Yeni Amasyaspor (ranked 143) eliminating Kayseri Erciyesspor (ranked 38).
 Lowest ranked team qualified for the next round was Yeni Amasyaspor (ranked 143); highest ranked team got eliminated was Adanaspor (ranked 16).

Third round
 10 teams from Super League, 12 teams from First League, 21 teams from Second League, 10 teams from Third League and 1 team from Regional Amateur League competed in this round. Seeds were applied in this round's draw.

 9 teams (90%) from Super League, 6 teams (50%) from First League, 7 teams (33%) from Second League, 4 teams (40%) from Third League and 1 team (100%) from Regional Amateur League qualified for the next round.
 17 seeded (63%) and 10 unseeded (37%) teams qualified for the next round.
 Biggest upset was Yeni Amasyaspor (ranked 143) eliminating Denizlispor (ranked 33).
 Lowest ranked team qualified for the next round was Yeni Amasyaspor (ranked 143); highest ranked team got eliminated was Antalyaspor (ranked 9).

Group stage
 14 teams from Super League, 6 teams from First League, 7 teams from Second League, 4 teams from Third League and 1 team from Regional Amateur League competed in this round. Seeds were applied in this round's draw. The pots for the group stage draw were as follows:

 Teams competed in a round-robin format with top two teams qualifying from each group. In case of equal points, head-to-head record was taken into account to determine the final position of teams in the group.
 11 teams (79%) from Super League, 3 teams (50%) from First League and 2 teams (29%) from Second League qualified for the next round.
 12 seeded (75%) and 4 unseeded (25%) teams qualified for the next round.
 8 teams (100%) from Pot 1, 4 teams (50%) from Pot 2 and 4 teams (50%) from Pot 3 qualified for the next round.
 Lowest ranked team qualified for the next round was Gümüşhanespor (ranked 46); highest ranked team got eliminated was Bursaspor (ranked 11).

Round of 16 
 11 teams from Super League, 3 teams from First League and 2 teams from Second League competed in this round.
 7 teams (64%) from Super League and 1 team (33%) from First League qualified for the next round.
 5 seeded (63%) and 3 unseeded (38%) teams qualified for the next round.
 Biggest upset was Kayserispor (ranked 15) eliminating Gençlerbirliği (ranked 10).
 Lowest ranked team qualified for the next round was Sivasspor (ranked 19); highest ranked team got eliminated was Beşiktaş (ranked 1).

Summary table

|}

Matches

Quarter-finals 
 7 teams from Super League and 1 team from First League competed in this round. Seeds were applied in this round's draw.

Summary table

|-

|}

First leg

Second leg

Semi-finals

Summary table

|-
|}}

|}

First leg

Second leg

Final

The final contested in Eslkişehir as a one-off match. The winner awarded 50 medals per club along with the Turkish Cup trophy.

References

http://www.tff.org.tr/Resources/TFF/Documents/STATULER/2016-2017/Turkiye-Kupasi-Statusu.pdf

Turkish Cup seasons
Turkey
Cup